Manor Club is a historic clubhouse located at Pelham Manor, Westchester County, New York. It was built in 1921–1922, and is a Tudor Revival style "L"-shaped building consisting of a one-story sunroom, two-story main clubhouse, and three-story theater.  The stuccoed building features half-timbering, bracketed timber entrances, and a large hipped roof.  Some additions and modifications to the original building occurred in the 1930s.  The building housed a local woman's club.

It was listed on the National Register of Historic Places in 2014.

References

Women's clubs in the United States
Clubhouses on the National Register of Historic Places in New York (state)
Tudor Revival architecture in New York (state)
Buildings and structures completed in 1922
Buildings and structures in Westchester County, New York
National Register of Historic Places in Westchester County, New York
History of women in New York (state)
Women's club buildings in New York (state)